"It Ain't Right" is a popular song written by Bob Rothberg and Joseph Meyer. It was recorded by Stuff Smith during the 1930s.  Smith performed at the Onyx Club on 52nd Street in New York City during the 1930s.

Others to record the song include:
 The Red Clay Ramblers, included on their 1986 release It Ain't Right 
 The Red Stick Ramblers, included on their 2005 release Right Key, Wrong Keyhole
 The electro-swing band Caravan Palace features samples from this piece in their song "Rock It For Me", from the album titled "Panic". 
 The Austrian electro-swing DJ Parov Stelar features samples from this piece in his song "Mama Talking", from his album "The Burning Spider".
 Odd Chap who's also an electro-swing dj remixed it in 2020
 

1930s songs
Songs written by Joseph Meyer (songwriter)
Songs written by Bob Rothberg
Year of song missing